Lout Pond is an  kettlehole pond in Plymouth, Massachusetts, east of Billington Sea, southeast of Morton Park, and northwest of Cooks Pond. The northern and southern shores have been developed extensively. Cranberry bogs are along the western shore, and Billington Street runs along the eastern shore. Parking is available along the side of the road; however, due to the steep bank only canoes and car top boats can be launched, electric motors only.

"Lout" is a name derived from the Latin lout, meaning "clay" or "mud".

References

External links
MassWildlife - Pond Map and Info

Ponds of Plymouth, Massachusetts
Ponds of Massachusetts